Calamity Anne's Inheritance is a 1913 American silent short Western film directed by Allan Dwan. It stars Louise Lester as Calamity Anne, with J. Warren Kerrigan and Charlotte Burton.

Cast
 Louise Lester as Calamity Anne
 J. Warren Kerrigan as The Agent
 Charlotte Burton
 Jessalyn Van Trump
 Jack Richardson

External links
 

1913 films
1913 Western (genre) films
1910s romance films
American black-and-white films
American romance films
American silent short films
Inheritance
Silent American Western (genre) films
1910s American films